Clotting time (also called Prothrombin time) is the time required for a sample of blood to coagulate in vitro under standard conditions.

There are various methods for determining the clotting time, the most common being the capillary tube method. It is affected by calcium ion levels and many diseases. The normal range of clotting times is 2-8 minutes.

For the measurement of clotting time by the test tube method, blood is placed in a glass test tube and kept at 37° C. The required time for the blood to clot is measured.

There are several other methods, including testing for those on blood thinners, such as heparin or warfarin. Activated partial thromboplastin time (aPTT) is used for heparin studies and the normal range is 20–36 seconds, depending upon which type of activator is used in the study. Prothrombin time (PT) is used for warfarin studies and the normal values differ for men and women. Adult male PT normal range is 9.6–11.8 seconds, while adult females' normal range is 9.5–11.3 seconds. Internationalized normalized ratio (INR) is also a warfarin study, with normal ranges of 2–3 for standard warfarin and 3–4.5 for high-dose warfarin. In a veterinary study of bovine animals, the mean ACT was 145 seconds with a range of 120–180 seconds. Standard deviations were 18 and 13 for the first and second sampling, respectively. Repeatability of the ACT was acceptable.

References

Blood